Virga Parish is an administrative unit of South Kurzeme Municipality in the Courland region of Latvia. The parish has a population of 924 (as of 1/07/2013) and covers an area of 86.21 km2.

Villages of Virga parish 
 Paplaka
 Paplakas stacija
 Purmsāti
 Virga

External links

Parishes of Latvia
South Kurzeme Municipality
Courland